Loxocera aristata is a species of fly and member of the family Psilidae.

Description
These flies have a dark, slender body. Head is black, thorax is black anteriorly and orange-brown posteriorly, while the abdomen is black. Legs are yellowish. Wings are hyaline.

Distribution
This species is present in Europe. It can be found in hedge rows and grassy meadows.

Bibliography
 Systema Dipterorum. Pape T. & Thompson F.C. (eds)
 Collin, J.E. 1944a. The British species of Psilidae (Diptera). Entomologist's Monthly Magazine 80: 214-224.
 Greve, L. & Skartveit, J. 2001. The genus Loxocera (Psilidae, Diptera) in Norway. Norw. J. Entomol. 48, 329-334

References

Psilidae
Muscomorph flies of Europe
Insects described in 1801